The Badia delle Sante Flora e Lucilla or Abbey of Saints Flora e Lucilla is a Medieval abbey in Arezzo, Tuscany, Italy.

History
Construction of the church began in 1278; and by 1315, the adjacent monastery was built.  The cloister (1489) was designed by Giuliano da Maiano. The church was rebuilt starting in 1565 under the designs of Giorgio Vasari. The work was not completed till 1650, when the bell-tower and presbytery were completed.

The presbytery has altar (1563) designed by Vasari for his family and once in his parish church of Santa Maria, and moved here in 1865. The church also houses a painted Crucifix (1319) by Segna di Bonaventura and frescoes of the life of St Lawrence (1476) by Bartolomeo della Gatta. The cupola was painted on canvas (1702) by the Baroque painter Andrea Pozzo.

References

13th-century Roman Catholic church buildings in Italy
16th-century Roman Catholic church buildings in Italy
Christian monasteries established in the 13th century
Roman Catholic churches completed in 1650
Roman Catholic churches in Arezzo
Monasteries in Tuscany
1650 establishments in Italy
17th-century Roman Catholic church buildings in Italy